Paul Joseph Chryst (born November 17, 1965) is a former American football head coach and former player. He was most recently the head football coach for the Wisconsin Badgers. Chryst was the head coach at the University of Pittsburgh from 2012 to 2014. Prior to his head coaching career, Chryst had previously been the offensive coordinator at Wisconsin from 2005 through 2011. He also served in the same capacity at Oregon State University and was an assistant coach for the San Diego Chargers of the National Football League. Chryst played college football at Wisconsin, where he lettered as a quarterback and tight end from 1986 to 1988.

Early life
The son of a high school football coach, Chryst was born and raised in Madison, Wisconsin. The family moved to Platteville, Wisconsin, when his father, the late George Chryst, became the head football coach at the University of Wisconsin–Platteville in 1979.

Chryst attended Platteville High School, where he was a three-time letterman in football and basketball, and also lettered in baseball and track. As the starting quarterback, he led the 1982 and 1983 Hillmen to consecutive Southern Eight Conference titles and the Wisconsin Division 4 state championship in 1983.

Chryst graduated from the University of Wisconsin in 1988 with a degree in political science, and was a two-time football letter winner at the quarterback and tight end position for the Badgers. He added a master's degree in educational administration from West Virginia in 1990.

Coaching career
Paul Chryst started his career as a graduate assistant at West Virginia (1989–90), and was then an assistant coach for the World League's San Antonio Riders (1991–92), UW–Platteville (1993), Ottawa Rough Riders (1994), Illinois State (1995), Saskatchewan Roughriders (1996), and Oregon State (1997–98).

He was the tight ends coach for the NFL's San Diego Chargers from 1999 to 2001, where he was instrumental in the development of Freddie Jones into one of the NFL's top tight ends, as well as coaching Steve Heiden, who eventually started with the Cleveland Browns.

Chryst was offensive coordinator and quarterbacks coach at Oregon State in 2003–04.  The Beavers ranked 10th nationally in total offense (463.0 ypg) and 6th nationally in passing yardage per game (328.1) in 2003. The 2003 Beavers became the first team in NCAA Division I history with a 4,000-yard passer, 1,500-yard rusher and two 1,000-yard receivers. Among the Oregon State stars he coached were RB Ken Simonton, the school's career rushing leader, QB Derek Anderson, who left as the Pac-10's No. 2 career passing leader, and RB Steven Jackson, a 2004 first-round draft choice for the St. Louis Rams.

After a one-year stint as the Badgers' tight ends coach in 2002, Chryst returned to Wisconsin in 2005 and under his direction, the Wisconsin offense showed immediate and drastic improvement. The 2005 team set school records for both scoring average (34.3 ppg) and for points scored in a season (446).  UW scored at least 40 points six times in 2005.  After ending the 2005 season with a 10–3 record, the 2006 offense was again potent under Chryst, and helped the team to a strong 12–1 finish.  Chryst's strong offenses helped guide Wisconsin to back-to-back Rose Bowl appearances in 2010 and 2011. Chryst was a 2011 finalist for the Broyles Award, given annually to the nation's top college football assistant coach.

University of Pittsburgh
Chryst was hired as the head football coach at the University of Pittsburgh on December 22, 2012. Chryst had a record of 19–19 before being offered the head coaching position at Wisconsin. He won the Little Caesar's Bowl during the 2013 season.

University of Wisconsin
On December 17, 2014, Chryst was introduced as the head coach at Wisconsin following the departure of Gary Andersen.

In Chryst's first season, the Badgers went 10–3 and finished 1st nationally in scoring defense (13.7 points per game) and 2nd in total defense (268.5 yards per game). All three losses came to teams that were in the AP top 25 at the end of the season, eventual national champions #1 Alabama, #9 Iowa and #23 Northwestern. Chryst also won the Holiday Bowl against USC, whom the Badgers had a 0–6 record against before the game, with their last meeting being in 1965 at the Colosseum in Los Angeles.

In the opening game of the 2016 season, the unranked Badgers upset #5 LSU at Lambeau Field. Following the opening week of college football when the new AP Poll was released the Badgers were ranked #10, the highest the Badgers had been ranked since the 2011 season where Chryst was the offensive coordinator for the Russell Wilson-led Wisconsin team. On November 29, 2016, Chryst was named the Hayes-Schembechler Coach of the Year in the Big Ten Conference.

Despite the Badgers going 12–1 in 2017, Wisconsin was held out of the College Football Playoff. However, they beat Miami in the 2017 Orange Bowl.

In 2021 the Badgers started with a dismal 1-3 record, before starting a 7-game win streak. At 8-3 they needed to beat Minnesota to clinch the Big 10 West, but ended up losing 13-23. On one possession, Chryst elected to punt instead of going for it, even though they were down 10 midway through the fourth quarter.
The Badgers finished the season with a record of 9-4 with a 20-13 victory over Arizona State in the Las Vegas Bowl.

Chryst was fired on October 2, 2022, after the Badgers started the 2022 season 2–3 (0–2 Big Ten). He finished at Wisconsin with an overall record of 67–26, and 43–18 in Big Ten play.

Personal life
Chryst and his wife, Robin, have three children, daughters Katy and JoJo, and son Danny. He is the brother of former Mid-American Conference commissioner Rick Chryst and former San Francisco 49ers offensive coordinator Geep Chryst. His nephews Keller Chryst and Jackson Chryst play football. Keller played quarterback for Tennessee while Jackson is also a quarterback at University of Wisconsin Whitewater.

Head coaching record

References

External links
 Wisconsin profile

1965 births
Living people
American football quarterbacks
Illinois State Redbirds football coaches
Oregon State Beavers football coaches
Ottawa Rough Riders coaches
Pittsburgh Panthers football coaches
San Antonio Riders coaches
San Diego Chargers coaches
Saskatchewan Roughriders coaches
West Virginia Mountaineers football coaches
Wisconsin Badgers football coaches
Wisconsin Badgers football players
Wisconsin–Platteville Pioneers football coaches
People from Platteville, Wisconsin
Sportspeople from Madison, Wisconsin
Coaches of American football from Wisconsin
Players of American football from Wisconsin